Don Z. Ross (October 6, 1946 – June 2, 1995) was a professional bodybuilder, wrestler and weight training coach from California. He performed under the names 'Ripper Savage' and 'The Bronx Barbarian'.

Books
 Fundamentals of Bodybuilding. Collier Books (1985)

Death

Don Ross was a Professional Bodybuilder, born in Detroit, Michigan. From 1979 until his unfortunate death in 1995, Don Ross was an extremely popular writer, story teller, and advocate of all bodybuilders and strength athletes.

References

External links
 Photo at classicbodybuilders.com

1946 births
1995 deaths